Robert Meyer (born 1945) is a Norwegian art photographer, professor, photo historian, collector, writer and publicist.

Robert Meyer may also refer to:
August Meyer (August Robert Meyer, 1851–1905), American engineer
Robert René Meyer-Sée (1884 – after 1947),  French art dealer and critic
Jack Meyer (John Robert Meyer, 1932–1967), American baseballer
Bob Meyer (logician) (1932–2009), Australian professor
Bob Meyer (born 1939), American baseballer
Robert Meyer, American engineer and husband of pilot Marta Bohn-Meyer (1957–2005)
Robert Meyer Burnett (born 1967), American film producer
Robert Meyer (pathologist) (1864–1947), German pathologist
Robert J. Meyer (1935–1984), American politician in the New Jersey General Assembly
Robert B. Meyer (born 1943), American physicist

See also 
Robert Meier (1897-2007), formerly Germany's oldest living man
Robert Meyers (disambiguation)
Robert Myers (disambiguation)
Robert H. Meyer Memorial State Beach, state beach of California